The Bolshakovo transmitter was the most powerful medium-wave broadcasting station in the world, situated near Bolshakovo, Russia. It was used by Voice of Russia for broadcasting on the medium-wave frequencies 1116 kHz and 1386 kHz with a maximum transmitter power of 2.5 Megawatts. An SV4+4 ARRT-Antenna with eight guyed masts is installed. The masts, built in 1974, are 257 metres tall.

On November 1, 2007, Russia ceased using the frequency of 1386 kHz.

However, it is still listed as a shortwave station, and can clearly be heard in the UK transmitting in DRM mode on 6155 kHz between 15:00 UTC and 17:00 UTC on weekdays. This is despite it only apparently radiating 15 kW, and the fact that the UK is around 1700 km away from the transmitter and 50 - 60 degrees off the advertised beam direction.

See also 
 List of famous transmission sites
 List of tallest structures in the former Soviet Union

References

External links 
 http://vcfm.ru/vc/Cities/kaliningrad.htm 
 http://www.radioscanner.ru/forum/index.php?action=vthread&forum=5&topic=19657

Towers in Russia
Radio masts and towers in Europe
Towers completed in 1974
1974 establishments in Russia
Radio in the Soviet Union
Towers built in the Soviet Union